Tomas Ražanauskas (born 7 January 1976) is a Lithuanian professional football coach and a former player. He is an assistant coach with the Lithuania national team.

He played in the position of midfielder and was also a member of the Lithuania national football team.

Before the start of the 2013 Latvian Higher League season Ražanauskas was appointed by Daugava Rīga as the assistant manager, helping Virginijus Liubšys. Before the start of the 2014 season Ražanauskas returned to Lithuania and became an assistant managers of Robertas Poškus at FC Klaipėdos granitas team.

In 2015 he graduated from Lithuanian Sports University. In 2016 he received a UEFA Pro Licence.

Honours
 Baltic Cup
 1996

External links
 
 
 

1976 births
Living people
Sportspeople from Vilnius
Lithuanian footballers
Association football midfielders
Lithuanian expatriate footballers
Lithuania international footballers
FK Žalgiris players
FC Vilnius players
FC Torpedo Moscow players
FC Torpedo-2 players
Russian Premier League players
FC KAMAZ Naberezhnye Chelny players
FC Flora players
Servette FC players
Malmö FF players
SK Brann players
FK Panerys Vilnius players
A.P.O. Akratitos Ano Liosia players
Trelleborgs FF players
Anorthosis Famagusta F.C. players
Pors Grenland players
Shamakhi FK players
A Lyga players
Eliteserien players
Allsvenskan players
Cypriot First Division players
Lithuanian expatriate sportspeople in Sweden
Lithuanian expatriate sportspeople in Cyprus
Lithuanian expatriate sportspeople in Estonia
Lithuanian expatriate sportspeople in Norway
Lithuanian expatriate sportspeople in Azerbaijan
Lithuanian expatriate sportspeople in Russia
Expatriate footballers in Sweden
Expatriate footballers in Cyprus
Expatriate footballers in Estonia
Expatriate footballers in Norway
Expatriate footballers in Azerbaijan
Expatriate footballers in Russia
Expatriate football managers in Latvia
Lithuanian expatriate sportspeople in Latvia
Lithuanian football managers
Lithuanian expatriate football managers
Meistriliiga players